Dan Porat is an Israeli historian and author who works for the Hebrew University of Jerusalem.

Works

References

Academic staff of the Hebrew University of Jerusalem
Israeli historians
Historians of the Holocaust
Israeli male writers
Year of birth missing